René Bittinger (born 9 October 1954, in Villé) is a French former professional road bicycle racer. He competed in the individual road race event at the 1976 Summer Olympics.

Major results

1979
Ambert
Tour de France:
Winner stage 1
1980
Tour du Limousin
1982
Antibes
Nice-Alassio
1983
Montauroux

References

External links 

1954 births
Living people
French male cyclists
French Tour de France stage winners
Cyclists at the 1976 Summer Olympics
Olympic cyclists of France
Sportspeople from Bas-Rhin
Cyclists from Grand Est
21st-century French people
20th-century French people